Edward August Rath (April 17, 1907 – October 28, 1968) was an American politician who served as the first county executive of Erie County, New York.

Career 
Following the transition from the board of supervisors form of government for Erie County to a County Executive form, Rath was elected in 1960 to an initial three-year term. The Edward A. Rath County Office Building, is named in his honor.

Rath was re-elected as County Executive in 1963 and 1967. He died in office in 1968 and was succeeded by Sheriff B. John Tutuska.

Personal life
Rath was the patriarch of a prominent Western New York political family. His son, Edward A. Rath, Jr. (1930-2003), served as a justice of the New York State Supreme Court and his daughter-in-law, Mary Lou Rath was a member of the New York State Senate and a former minority leader of the Erie County Legislature. His grandson, Edward Rath III, is a member of the New York State Senate.

References

Politicians from Buffalo, New York
New York (state) Republicans
Erie County Executives
1968 deaths
1907 births
20th-century American politicians